Carlos Alberto Martínez (born 23 April 1957) is an Argentine alpine skier. He competed in three events at the 1976 Winter Olympics.

References

1957 births
Living people
Argentine male alpine skiers
Olympic alpine skiers of Argentina
Alpine skiers at the 1976 Winter Olympics
Sportspeople from Bariloche